Christ Episcopal Church is a historic Episcopal church located in Marlboro, Ulster County, New York.  The church was designed by architect Richard Upjohn and built in 1858 in the Gothic Revival style. It is built of dark red brick with contrasting brownstone detailing. It features a square entry tower and polygonal apse with steeply pitched roofs, with polychrome slate shingles on the main section. It also has a notable collection of stained glass windows designed by D. Maitland Armstrong (1836-1918). Also on the property is the church rectory (1863) and cemetery, with burials dating before 1840.

It was listed on the National Register of Historic Places in 2010.

References

External links
Christ Episcopal Church website

Episcopal church buildings in New York (state)
Churches on the National Register of Historic Places in New York (state)
Churches completed in 1858
19th-century Episcopal church buildings
Gothic Revival church buildings in New York (state)
Churches in Ulster County, New York
National Register of Historic Places in Ulster County, New York